is a Japanese model, entertainer, and actress who was represented by Office Palette until March 31, 2010, and by Asia Business Partners after that. Her husband is former Japan national football team player Junichi Inamoto.

Filmography

Dramas

Variety series

Television networks

Films

References

External links
 

Japanese female models
Japanese television personalities
Japanese actresses
1983 births
Living people
People from Nishitōkyō, Tokyo
Models from Tokyo Metropolis